Helmet is an American alternative metal band from New York City formed in 1989 by vocalist and lead guitarist Page Hamilton. Helmet has had numerous lineup changes with Hamilton as the only constant member. Since 2010, the band has consisted of Hamilton, drummer Kyle Stevenson, guitarist Dan Beeman and bassist Dave Case.

Helmet has released eight studio albums and two compilation albums. After releasing their debut album, Strap It On (1990), on Amphetamine Reptile, Helmet signed to Interscope Records and released three albums for the label, including the highly successful Meantime (1992). Their next two albums ― Betty (1994) and Aftertaste (1997) ― were also successful, but did not match the critical or popular acclaim of Meantime. Helmet broke up in 1998, but reformed in 2004, and has since released four more albums ― Size Matters (2004), Monochrome (2006), Seeing Eye Dog (2010) and Dead to the World (2016). The band is currently working on their ninth studio album.

History

Formation and early years (1989–1991)
Hamilton formed Helmet in early 1989 after leaving the alternative rock group Band of Susans with whom he had recorded two albums. Having originally moved to New York to study jazz guitar at the Manhattan School of Music, the Oregon born guitarist recruited bassist Henry Bogdan who was also from Oregon, Australian guitarist Peter Mengede and Floridian drummer John Stanier as the group's first official line-up. Before Hamilton had settled on a name, the guitarist Peter Mengede's then-wife Reyne Cuccuro suggested the Germanic name "Helmuth". Hamilton misinterpreted her and mistakenly believed that she was referring to the form of protective gear. Hamilton then thought excitedly that Helmet had "sounded like a pretty cool name for a band" and opted for the Anglicized spelling. Other names taken in consideration were "Cry Ruth" and "Poly Orchids", along with the more esoteric and obscure "Tuna Lorenzo" and "Froth Albumen".

They were spotted by Tom Hazelmyer, guitarist of the band Halo of Flies, and signed to Hazelmeyer's label Amphetamine Reptile Records, releasing their first 7 inch single, "Born Annoying", later that year. Amphetamine Reptile released Helmet's debut studio album Strap It On in 1990, selling over 40,000 copies soon thereafter. Hazelmyer once stated that the album kept the label going through the 1990s.

Eschewing the traditional metal image of long hair and black clothing, the band stood out with their preference for simple T-shirts, jeans, and sneakers, and short haircuts. Their atypical look was referenced in an episode of Beavis and Butt-Head, in which the pair's commentary on the video for "Unsung" included the lines "That drummer looks like a regular guy" and "If you, like, saw these guys on the street, you wouldn't even know they were cool."

Commercial successes (1992–1998)
The band achieved mainstream attention after signing to major label Interscope Records in early 1992. It is rumored that the members received in excess of one million dollars at signing, along with an unprecedented amount of control over their work. Their first album for Interscope, Meantime, was released in 1992 and certified gold in 1994. The album has sold over two million copies worldwide and remains Helmet's top-selling album.

Helmet toured the United States, Brazil, Europe, and Asia relentlessly, generally with other AmRep recording artists. Internal tensions rose high at times. In early 1993, guitarist Peter Mengede left the band and formed Handsome which released one album in 1997. Mengede was replaced by Rob Echeverria, guitarist from the hardcore band Rest in Pieces. Helmet's third album, Betty, was released in 1994. Despite managing the band's highest-ever chart position on the Billboard 200  at number 45, the album did not sell as many copies as Meantime. In 1995, the band appeared in The Jerky Boys: The Movie, covering Black Sabbath's "Symptom of the Universe" with Ozzy Osbourne making a cameo appearance as the band's manager. Later, after recording and touring in support of Betty, Echeverria made an amicable departure from the band to join Biohazard.

Helmet pushed on to record 1997's Aftertaste as a three-piece. A first version of the album had been withdrawn at the last minute in the fall of 1996 when promotional activities had already begun, delaying the disc's release to March of the following year with a new audio mix. Guitarist Chris Traynor (formerly of Orange 9mm) was recruited for the tour to support the album. While the song "Exactly What You Wanted" became a moderate radio hit, the album did not fare as well as Helmet's prior major label releases, spending a few weeks on the Billboard 200 chart and selling 132,000 copies over the next decade. The Aftertaste Tour in 1997 would prove to be the band's last for nearly a decade. Amid long-standing private disputes, the members decided to call it quits, with Helmet's original final performance occurring in Italy on December 10, 1997. Asked about the breakup, Hamilton replied, "9 years, 1,600 shows, 5 albums, and we found it hard to look at each other anymore"

Aftermath and subsequent projects (1999–2003)
After the dissolution of Helmet, the members went on to different projects.

Hamilton relocated from New York to Los Angeles and became involved in a variety of projects. This included playing guitar for David Bowie, doing sessions for film scores, working with composer Elliot Goldenthal on the 1999 soundtracks to In Dreams and Titus. It was Hamilton's second time working with Goldenthal, the first being the 1995 soundtrack to the movie Heat. When working on film scores, he was part of a "guitar orchestra" called "Deaf Elk" with other guitarists. He periodically returned to New York to work with his band Gandhi, which is where several of the songs appearing on Size Matters began.

Bogdan formed the Moonlighters in New York with Bliss Blood, for whom he played steel guitar, before returning home to Oregon to play for the Midnight Serenaders. Stanier took a break from drumming, but returned to play drums for Tomahawk, The Mark of Cain, Battles and Primer 55.

Reunion (2004–present)

After moving to Los Angeles, Hamilton began working with drummer John Tempesta (formerly of Testament and White Zombie) on a new project. After searching for a record label and a name for the project, Hamilton was urged by Jimmy Iovine of Interscope to release the new project under the established Helmet moniker, to which Interscope held the rights. Hamilton had resisted for some time, but since his relationships with Stanier and Bogdan had not improved since 1998, and his previous offers to reunite had been rebuffed or ignored, he decided to move on and release more music as Helmet without them.

Chris Traynor, still on good terms with Hamilton, soon came on board to cover bass and guitar parts. With Tempesta on drums and Hamilton covering vocals and guitar, the three recorded Size Matters in early 2004. The album featured lyrics which were inspired by Hamilton's brief 2003 relationship with Hollywood actress Winona Ryder, and has been cited by critics as a departure from Helmet's earlier, more experimental sound. Frank Bello was later recruited to play bass on the supporting tour; however, he left before its conclusion to reunite with his original band, Anthrax. Jeremy Chatelain replaced Bello for the duration of the tour. John Tempesta left in early 2006 to join The Cult.

In late 2005, Helmet were dropped by Interscope following lackluster sales for Size Matters. Helmet then signed with Warcon Enterprises and announced that a new album was in the works. Helmet performed at the 2006 SXSW festival in Austin, Texas, with a temporary lineup consisting of Charlie Walker on drums, Chris Traynor on bass, and Anthony Truglio (formerly of Gandhi) on guitar. The new album, Monochrome, was recorded and co-produced by Wharton Tiers, who recorded Helmet's first two albums, Strap It On and Meantime. For the album, Hamilton and Traynor returned to the studio with newly recruited drummer, Mike Jost (formerly of Adair). Helmet headlined the 2006 Warped Tour in support of Monochrome, with Jeremy Chatelain reprising his role from the 2005 Size Matters tour. The band later split with Warcon due to a variety of financial disputes between Hamilton and the label's owners. Hamilton stated "Amphetamine Reptile and Interscope were both fantastic experiences for us, and Warcon was the first time that I’d actually run into any problems with a label. I trusted somebody and got screwed. I’m not bitter about it, but I lost a lot of money. They never paid me tour support that they were contractually obligated to pay. There were a lot of things. I’ve never seen one penny of royalties from them, but I own the record [Monochrome] now, so it’s my record."

In September 2006, Chris Traynor announced that he had left the band after nearly a decade of working with Page Hamilton. A few days later, Mike Jost also left the band to attend to his duties as a new father. Jeremy Chatelain also made other commitments. Hamilton announced in early October 2006 that drum and bass duties would be filled by Kyle Stevenson and Jon Fuller, respectively, both from Milwaukee, and both previously members of Big Collapse. Australian Jimmy Thompson (formerly of Full Scale) also joined the band on guitar in 2006, but was replaced by Dan Beeman by late 2008. Due to line-up changes, Hamilton was forced to cancel many shows scheduled for late 2006 in the U.S. and Europe. Helmet opened up for Guns N' Roses for the remaining dates of their tour in December 2006. The band toured Australia in April and May 2008, playing shows throughout the eastern and southern coasts. Helmet's seventh studio album, Seeing Eye Dog, was released on September 7, 2010.

On November 20, 2011, Helmet announced the European Meantime Anniversary Tour running from March 5 to April 8, 2012, encompassing 28 shows in Portugal, Spain, Switzerland, Italy, Germany, Austria, Denmark, Netherlands, Belgium and the UK during which they played the whole of the 'Meantime in its entirety.

On October 28, 2016, Helmet released their eighth studio album, Dead to the World.

The band announced tour dates for May 2018 in the U.S. and July-August in Europe on their official website. Helmet also celebrated their 30th anniversary in 2019 with a European and North American tour.

In November 2019, St. Paul Pioneer Press reported that the band has been working on a new album.

Musical style
Many critics cite Helmet as an alternative metal band; however, the band has been categorized under many genres, including post-hardcore, noise rock, experimental metal and post-metal. Jim Farber of the New York Daily News has jokingly labeled Helmet as "smart rock".
Their music is characterized by repetitive, syncopated, staccato guitar riffs, often in unconventional time signatures, and almost always in a minor key with drop-D or drop-C tuning. The guitar sound is heavily distorted and dissonant, with choruses that often involve guitar feedback waves. Helmet has been described as a "thinking man's metal band"; according to Hamilton, the term came from original drummer John Stanier because he once heard an interviewer say it.

Legacy and influencesThe New York Times called Helmet "a band that made important connections between indie-rock and metal." They have had a large impact on many nu metal acts.Milner, Greg (November 2000). "Reviews: Native Sons", Spin 16 (11): 198. Musician Mike Patton has also cited Helmet as having a significant influence on his solo career; with original drummer John Stanier and Patton having played together in Tomahawk. Regarding Helmet's influence on rock, Hamilton remarked "I hear it all over the place. I've heard Helmet riffs in Evanescence. Kids today have no idea at this point, because they [first] got into, say, Korn or System of a Down. Bands like Mastodon and Norma Jean tell me, 'Oh, we ripped you guys off with this,' or 'We got turned on by that.' Some bands do cool things with it, and there's a bunch of shitty bands that have imitated us too."

In 2016, a tribute album titled Meantime Redux was released. It featured covers of 1990s Helmet songs (including all 10 songs from the Meantime album) by various underground hardcore bands. Deftones bassist Chi Cheng remarked "Every band should wish to aspire to the originality and genius of Helmet. An inspiration to fans and musicians-alike". Norma Jean guitarist Chris Day recalled in 2006 "The first song I ever learned to play on the guitar was a Helmet song. I pretty much just tried to figure the songs out and that's how I learned to play basically. Helmet is a band that I have listened to for years and will always enjoy them because they have the sweetest riffs I have ever heard. I love to air drum to them in the car also. I wouldn't be the same without Helmet in my life."

Helmet is considered a major influence on the nu metal genre, with the band's use of Drop D tuning influencing many in the genre. Hamilton,  displeased with this connection, responded "it's frustrating that people write [us] off because we're affiliated with or credited with or discredited with creating nu-metal and rap metal or whatever the fuck it is, which we sound nothing like." Though Hamilton would eventually go on to work with bands Linkin Park and P.O.D.

Discography

 Strap It On (1990)
 Meantime (1992)
 Betty (1994)
 Aftertaste (1997)
 Size Matters (2004)
 Monochrome (2006)
 Seeing Eye Dog (2010)
 Dead to the World'' (2016)

Band members

Current
 Page Hamilton – lead guitar, lead vocals (1989–1998, 2004–present)
 Kyle Stevenson – drums, backing vocals (2006–present)
 Dan Beeman – rhythm guitar, backing vocals (2008–present)
 Dave Case – bass, backing vocals (2010–present)

See also
List of alternative metal artists

References

External links

 
 

Alternative rock groups from New York (state)
American alternative metal musical groups
American post-hardcore musical groups
American post-metal musical groups
American noise rock music groups
Amphetamine Reptile Records artists
Heavy metal musical groups from New York (state)
Interscope Records artists
Musical groups established in 1989
Musical groups disestablished in 1998
Musical groups reestablished in 2004
Musical groups from New York City
Musical quartets
Let Them Eat Vinyl artists